The following lists events that happened during 2012 in Somalia.

Incumbents 
 President: 
 until 20 August: Sharif Sheikh Ahmed  
 20 August-28 August: Muse Hassan Sheikh Sayid Abdulle (acting)
 28 August-16 September: Mohamed Osman Jawari (acting)
 starting 16 September: Hassan Sheikh Mohamud
 Prime Minister: Abdiweli Mohamed Ali (until 17 October), Abdi Farah Shirdon (starting 17 October)

Events

September
 September 10 - Members of the new Somali Parliament elect Hassan Sheikh Mohamoud President.

See also
2012 timeline of the War in Somalia

References

 
Somalia
2010s in Somalia
Years of the 21st century in Somalia
Somalia